École Supérieure des Beaux-Arts, Genève (English: School of Fine Arts, Geneva), was an art school founded in 1748 in Geneva, Switzerland. In 2006, the school was merged with the Geneva University of Art and Design (HEAD).

History 
The École Supérieure des Beaux-Arts was founded in 1748 by the Conseil des Deux-Cents under the name École de Dessein (English: Drawing School). Pierre Soubeyran, the Genevan-French engraver served as the director of the school from 1709 to 1775.

From 1826 to 1872, the school was located at place de Neuve (basement of the Musée Rath). From 1872 to 1903, the school was located at current rue du Général-Dufour (a school known as Grutli). After having occupied various locations in the city of Geneva, the school occupied the building on Boulevard Helvétique in 1903. 

In 2001, it became the Geneva School of Fine Arts (ESBA), before merging in 2006 with the Geneva University of Art and Design (HEAD).

Notable people

Alumni

Faculty

References 

École Supérieure des Beaux-Arts, Genève
1748 establishments in Europe
2006 disestablishments in Switzerland